Evergreen Theatre is a touring educational, environmental, science-based, theatre company for young audiences in Alberta, Canada.

Evergreen produces musical theatre touring shows and artist-in-residency programs for schools, as well as workshops, presentations, and activities for conferences and organizations nationwide.

History 
In 1991, Evergreen Theatre was founded by Scott Mair, Tara Ryan, Elinor Holt, Gerald Matthews, Don Enright, and Monique Keiran.

Production History
Prior To 2006
Scripts written by Tara Ryan
Cliff & Edna Turn Green: endangered species, habitat & interrelationships
PondScum Inc.: wetlands, food chain, photosynthesis
We’re all Wet: phases of matter, watersheds, pollution & water treatment
Everything under the Sun: extraction of resources, electricity, circuits & safety
JUNK!: waste and the world, recycling, composting, man-made vs. natural waste
From the Ground Up: ecology, predator/prey relationships, decomposition
Full of Hot Air: weather/meteorology, clouds, greenhouse gasses & climate change
Rockin’ and Eroding: rocks/minerals, paleontology, sedimentation & geologic time
A Breath of Fresh Air: air, lungs, cardiovascular health, air quality & pollution
Captain Comet: space, asteroids, meteors & the components of a comet

2007 - 2008 Season
Food for Thought book and music by Ethan Cole
Go With The Flow book and music by Ethan Cole

2008 - 2009 Season
Food for Thought book and music by Ethan Cole
Go With The Flow book and music by Ethan Cole
The Three RRRs by Jacqueline Russell, music by David Morton

2009 - 2010 Season
Flushed by Meg Braem, music by David Morton
The Three RRRs by Jacqueline Russell, music by David Morton
Going to Extremes by Jacqueline Russell, music by David Morton

2010 - 2011 Season
Flushed by Meg Braem, music by David Morton
Lost, the Mystery of the Missing Species by Ellen Chorley, music by David Morton
Going to Extremes by Jacqueline Russell, music by David Morton

2011 - 2012 Season
Lost, the Mystery of the Missing Species by Ellen Chorley, music by David Morton
Princess Prudence and the Fairest in the Land by Jacqueline Russell, music by Allison Lynch
Fever Pitch by Ellen Chorley, music by David Morton

Community Affiliates 
Evergreen is a member of The Society of Educational Resource Groups, Alberta's Promise, Calgary Professional Arts Alliance, REAP Sustainable Business Association, and Theatre Alberta.

Funding 
Funding for Evergreen is raised primarily through program revenues and corporate partnership, however this organization also receives funding through the Province of Alberta through the Alberta Lottery Fund and Alberta Foundation for the Arts (AFA).

Awards 

 1998 - Alberta Emerald Award for Communication, Media & Arts
 1998 - Calgary Mayor's Environmental Excellence Award
 1999 - Interpretation Canada Gold Award
 1999 - Calgary Mayor's Environmental Excellence Award
 2002 - NSERC Michael Smith Award of Outstanding Educational Merit
 2002 - Global, Environment & Outdoor Education Award of Merit
 2003 - Recycling Council of Alberta's 3R's of Excellence Award
 2004 - Global Woman of Vision Award for Tara Ryan, Artistic Director
 2004 - Global, Environment & Outdoor Education Award of Merit
 2008 - Alberta's Promise Red Wagon Award

References

External links 
 Official Site

Theatre companies in Alberta
Organizations based in Calgary